The 1994–95 NBA season was the Clippers' 25th season in the National Basketball Association, and their first season in Anaheim. In the 1994 NBA draft, the Clippers selected Lamond Murray from the University of California with the seventh pick. During the off-season, the team acquired Pooh Richardson, Malik Sealy and rookie guard Eric Piatkowski from the Indiana Pacers, and signed free agent Tony Massenburg. The Clippers started the season playing their first two games against the Portland Trail Blazers in Yokohama, Japan. However, under new head coach Bill Fitch, they struggled losing their first 16 games of the season, as Stanley Roberts missed the entire season with a ruptured Achilles tendon. The Clippers held an 8–40 record at the All-Star break, and finished last place in the Pacific Division with the league's worst record at 17–65. 

Showing improvement was Loy Vaught, who led the team with 17.5 points and 9.7 rebounds per game, while Murray averaged 14.1 points per game, but was not selected to an All-Rookie Team at season's end, and Richardson provided the team with 10.9 points, 7.9 assists and 1.6 steals per game. In addition, Sealy contributed 13.0 points per game, while second-year guard Terry Dehere provided with 10.4 points per game off the bench, Massenburg averaged 9.3 points and 5.7 rebounds per game, and second-year forward Bo Outlaw led the team with 1.9 blocks per game.

The only highlight of the season was the Clippers defeating their crosstown rival, the Los Angeles Lakers, 109–84 at The Forum on December 9, 1994, which was their second win of the season. Following the season, Gary Grant was released to free agency, and signed as a free agent with the New York Knicks during the next season, while Massenburg left in the 1995 NBA Expansion Draft, and Elmore Spencer was traded to the Denver Nuggets.

Draft

Roster

Roster notes
 Center Stanley Roberts missed the entire season due to an Achilles tendon rupture.

Regular season

Season standings

z – clinched division title
y – clinched division title
x – clinched playoff spot

Record vs. opponents

Game log

Regular season

|- align="center" bgcolor="#ccffcc"
| 48
| February 9, 19957:30p.m. PST
| Houston
| W 122–107
| Vaught (33)
| Vaught (13)
| Richardson (14)
| Los Angeles Memorial Sports Arena7,178
| 8–40
|- align="center"
|colspan="9" bgcolor="#bbcaff"|All-Star Break
|- style="background:#cfc;"
|- bgcolor="#bbffbb"
|- align="center" bgcolor="#ffcccc"
| 49
| February 14, 199557:30p.m. PST
| @ Houston
| L 104–124
| Vaught (20)
| Outlaw (11)
| Woods (11)
| The Summit15,071
| 8–41

|- align="center" bgcolor="#ffcccc"
| 72
| March 30, 19957:30p.m. PST
| Houston
| L 96–108
| Murray (26)
| Vaught (16)
| Richardson (8)
| Los Angeles Memorial Sports Arena11,561
| 14–58

|- align="center" bgcolor="#ffcccc"
| 79
| April 17, 19955:30p.m. PDT
| @ Houston
| L 111–121
| Dehere (23)
| Vaught (12)
| Dehere (10)
| The Summit16,027
| 16–63

Player statistics

Player Statistics Citation:

Awards and records

Transactions
The Clippers were involved in the following transactions during the 1994–95 season.

Trades

Free agents

Additions

Subtractions

Player Transactions Citation:

See also
 Los Angeles Clippers
 Los Angeles Memorial Sports Arena
 Arrowhead Pond of Anaheim

Other Anaheim–based teams in 1994–95
 California Angels (Anaheim Stadium)
 1994 California Angels season
 1995 California Angels season
 Los Angeles Rams (Anaheim Stadium)
 1994 Los Angeles Rams season
 Mighty Ducks of Anaheim (Arrowhead Pond of Anaheim)
 1994–95 Mighty Ducks of Anaheim season
*Note: The Clippers played occasional games in Anaheim

References

Los Angeles Clippers seasons